The 1938 Massachusetts State Aggies football team represented Massachusetts State College in the 1938 college football season. The team was coached by Elbert Carraway and played its home games at Alumni Field in Amherst, Massachusetts. Mass State finished the season with a record of 3–6.

Schedule

References

Massachusetts State
UMass Minutemen football seasons
Massachusetts State Aggies football